Genstar may refer to:
 Genstar Development Company, a Canadian real estate development company
 Genstar Capital, a U.S. private equity firm